Derek Lee (also known as Derek E. Lee or Derek Edward Lee) is an American ecologist and wildlife biologist specializing in population biology and conservation biology. Lee was born in Lodi, California on March 15, 1971, and attended Tokay High School. Lee earned his bachelor's degree from the University of California at Santa Barbara, his master's degree from Humboldt State University, and his Ph.D. from Dartmouth College. For his MS degree he investigated the migratory behavior of black brant geese in Humboldt Bay using capture-recapture statistics to estimate stopover duration and space use. For his Ph.D., he studied the spatial demography of giraffes in the Tarangire ecosystem of Tanzania. His academic work on climate influences on marine bird demography, spotted owls and forest fire, and computer vision applications to wildlife biology are highly cited. His discovery of a white leucistic giraffe was widely reported in popular media. 

He worked at Point Blue Conservation Science for 8 years on Southeast Farallon Island studying how ocean climate change affects the population dynamics of marine predators such as elephant seals, Cassin's auklets, and common murres. He is founder and CEO of Wild Nature Institute, a research organization. Since 2018 he has also worked at Pennsylvania State University as an Associate Research Professor. 

Lee has published more than 50 scientific peer-reviewed papers in the field of ecology, mainly focused on demography and population biology of wild vertebrates.

References 

American ecologists
Dartmouth College alumni
California State Polytechnic University, Humboldt alumni
1971 births
Living people
University of California, Santa Barbara alumni
Wildlife biologists